This article is about the particular significance of the decade 1790 - 1799 to Wales and its people.

Incumbents
Prince of Wales - George (later George IV)
Princess of Wales - Caroline of Brunswick (from 1795)

Events
1790
1791
1792
1793
1794
1795 
1796
1797
1798
1799

Arts and literature

New books
1790
Thomas Edwards (Twm o'r Nant) - Gardd o Gerddi
Thomas Pennant - Indian Zoology
Peter Williams - Tafol i Bwyso Sosiniaeth
1792
Hester Thrale - The Three Warnings
Nicholas Owen - Carnarvonshire, a Sketch of its History, etc.
1793
Edward Daniel Clarke - A Tour Through the South of England, Wales, and Part of Ireland, Made During the Summer of 1791
1794
Iolo Morganwg - Poems Lyric and Pastoral
Peter Williams -Gwreiddyn y Mater
1795
Thomas Evans (Tomos Glyn Cothi) - The Miscellaneous Repository neu Y Drysorfa Gymysgedig
John Jones (Jac Glan-y-gors) - Seren Tan Gwmmwl
1797
Edward Charles - Epistolau Cymraeg at y Cymry
John Jones (Jac Glan-y-gors) - Toriad y Dydd
Nathaniel Williams - Pregeth a Bregethwyd yn Llangloffan ar Neilltuad … Joseph James a James Davies
1798
Thomas Roberts of Llwyn'rhudol - Cwyn yn erbyn Gorthrymder
Hester Thrale - Three Warnings to John Bull before he dies. By an Old Acquaintance of the Public
1799
Philip Yorke - The Royal Tribes of Wales

Music
1798
Edward Jones (Bardd y Brenin) - Popular Cheshire Melodies

Births
1790
27 January - William Davies Evans, chess player (d. 1872)
11 August - William Probert, minister and author (d. 1870)
16 September - Thomas Vowler Short, Bishop of St Asaph
29 September - John Jones (printer) (d. 1855)
1791
date unknown - Robert Everett, Independent minister and writer (d. 1875)
1792
23 July - Aneurin Owen, scholar (d. 1851)
5 September - Sir David Davies, royal physician (d. 1865)
20 December - David Griffiths, missionary (d. 1863)
date unknown - Sir Charles John Salusbury, Baronet (d. 1868)
1793
17 January - Owen Owen Roberts, physician (d. 1866)
March - Lewis Lewis (Lewsyn yr Heliwr), political activist (date of death unknown)
19 July - John Propert, physician (d. 1867)
10 August - John Crichton-Stuart, 2nd Marquess of Bute (d. 1848)
25 September - Felicia Hemans, poet (d. 1835)
1794
7 May - Rees Howell Gronow, memoirist (d. 1865)
3 November - David Thomas, industrialist (d. 1882)
date unknown
Evan Davies (Eta Delta), Independent minister (d. 1855)
Thomas Jenkyn, theologian (d. 1858)
1795
13 January - Edward Lloyd-Mostyn, 2nd Baron Mostyn, politician (d. 1884)
5 August - George Rice-Trevor, 4th Baron Dynevor, politician (d. 1869)
December - John Davies, philosopher (d. 1861)
7 December - Samuel George Homfray, industrialist (d. 1882)
11 December - Thomas Taylor Griffith, surgeon (d. 1876)
1796
1 March - John Jones, Talysarn, preacher (d. 1857)
1797
11 January - Connop Thirlwall, Bishop of St David's (d. 1875)
1798
16 August - Alfred Ollivant, Bishop of Llandaff (d. 1882)
1799
30 June - David Williams, politician (d. 1869)

Deaths
1790
20 March - Thomas Richards of Coychurch, lexicographer, 80
16 October - Daniel Rowland, Methodist leader, 77
1791
11 January - William Williams (Pantycelyn), poet and hymn-writer, 73
13 February - William Parry, artist, 48
19 April - Richard Price, philosopher, 68
17 September - David Morris (hymn writer), 47
1792
10 March - John Stuart, 3rd Earl of Bute, friend of Augusta, Princess of Wales and ancestor of the Marquesses of Bute, 78
17 May - Sir Noah Thomas, royal physician, 72?
1793
5 January - Elizabeth Griffith, actress and writer, 73?
1794
22 January - John Stuart, Lord Mount Stuart, MP and heir of the Marquess of Bute, 26
?August - Sackville Gwynne, landowner, 43?
19 August - Sir Hugh Williams, 8th Baronet, soldier and politician, 76
Hon. William Paget, MP for Anglesey, 25?
1795
25 January - Morgan Edwards, Baptist historian, 72
14 October - Henry Owen, theologian, 79
1796
February - John Jones, organist, 70?
8 August - Peter Williams, Methodist writer, 63
1797
1 June - John Walters, lexicographer, 75
1798
6 July - Joshua Evans, Quaker minister of Welsh descent, 66
16 December - Thomas Pennant, naturalist and travel writer, 72
1799
May - John Evans, explorer, 29
4 November - Josiah Tucker, economist, 87

 
18th century in Wales
Wales
Wales
Decades in Wales